David Westheimer (April 11, 1917 in Houston, Texas – November 8, 2005) was an American novelist best known for writing the 1964 novel Von Ryan's Express which was adapted as a 1965 film starring Frank Sinatra and Trevor Howard.

Ironically, one of his most popular novels, and perhaps his most enduring, was not credited to him for much of its shelf life: In its original printing, he was by-lined as the author of the novelization of Days of Wine and Roses based on the screenplay by his friend J.P. Miller. But the book proved hugely popular and the story had become so iconic that its publisher Bantam Books (and one supposes the authors, by mutual arrangement) took Westheimer's name off the book to move it into the "literature" category and keep it in print (which they did, for decades). Subsequent printings were branded only J.P. Miller's Days of Wine and Roses without an explicit by-line for the novel.

Westheimer, a Rice University graduate, worked as an assistant editor for the Houston Post from 1939 to 1946 except for those years spent with the United States Army Air Forces during World War II. As a navigator in a B-24 he was shot down over Italy on December 11, 1942 and spent time as a prisoner of war in Stalag Luft III.

His first novel, Summer on the Water, was published in 1948.

In addition to Von Ryan's Express, Westheimer also wrote a television pilot set in an Italian prisoner of war camp called Campo 44.

Fiction
Summer on the Water, Macmillan, 1948
The Magic Fallacy, Macmillan, 1950.
Briefly noted in The New Yorker 25/50 (4 February 1950) : 90
Watching Out for Dulie, Dodd, 1960.
A Very Private Island, Signet (New American Library), 1962, under the pseudonym "Z.Z. Smith"
Days of Wine and Roses, Bantam, 1963 (novelization of the screenplay by J.P. Miller)
Von Ryan's Express, Doubleday, 1964.
My Sweet Charlie, Doubleday, 1965. (Adapted into a 1970 television movie.)
Song of the Young Sentry, Little, Brown, 1968.
Lighter than a Feather, Little, Brown, 1971.
Over the Edge, Little, Brown, 1972.
Going Public, Mason & Lipscomb, 1973.
The Olmec Head, Little, Brown, 1974.
The Avila Gold, Putnam, 1974.
Rider on the Wind, London: Michael Joseph, 1979.
Von Ryan's Return, Coward, 1980.
Delay en Route, 2004.

Nonfiction
Sitting it Out: A World War II POW Memoir, Rice University Press, 1992.

External links
"Author David Westheimer dies at 88"

20th-century American novelists
21st-century American novelists
American male novelists
Writers from Houston
1917 births
2005 deaths
San Jacinto High School alumni
Rice University alumni
United States Army personnel of World War II
World War II prisoners of war held by Germany
United States Army Air Forces soldiers
Houston Post people
Journalists from Texas
20th-century American journalists
American male journalists
20th-century American male writers
21st-century American male writers
Novelists from Texas
21st-century American non-fiction writers
American male non-fiction writers